Amblyodipsas is a genus of snakes found in Africa. Currently, 9 species are recognized. These snakes are often known as purple-glossed snakes or glossy snakes. Although rear-fanged, all species are considered harmless, but their venom has not been well studied. They should not be confused with the glossy snakes of the genus Arizona, which are found in North America.

Description
Maxillary very short, with five teeth gradually increasing in size and followed, after an interspace, by a large grooved fang situated below the eye. Mandibular teeth decreasing in size posteriorly. Head small, not distinct from neck; eye minute, with round pupil; nostril in a single very small nasal; no internasals; no loreal; no preocular; no anterior temporal. Body cylindrical. Dorsal scales smooth, without pits. Tail very short, obtuse. Subcaudals in two rows.

Species

*) Not including the nominate subspecies.
T) Type species.

See also
 Snakebite

References

Further reading

Branch, Bill (2004). Field Guide to Snakes and other Reptiles of Southern Africa. Third Revised edition, Second impression. Sanibel Island, Florida: Ralph Curtis Books. 399 pp. (Genus Amblyodipsas, p. 65).
Peters, W. (1857). "Über Amblyodipsas eine neue Schlangengattung aus Mossambique ". Monatsberichte der Königlichen Preussischen Akademie der Wissenschaften zu Berlin 1856: 592-595. (Amblyodipsas, new genus). (in German and Latin).

Atractaspididae
Snake genera
Snakes of Africa
Taxa named by Wilhelm Peters